Prairie Creek is a stream in the U.S. state of South Dakota. It is a tributary of Rapid Creek.

Prairie Creek was named for the prairies along its course.

See also
List of rivers of South Dakota

References

Rivers of Pennington County, South Dakota
Rivers of South Dakota